A second-degree relative (SDR) is someone who shares 25% of a person's genes. It includes uncles, aunts, nephews, nieces, grandparents, grandchildren,  half-siblings, and double cousins.

See also
Family
First-degree relative
Third-degree relative

References

Genetics
Family